Johannes Dürr (born 12 March 1987) is an Austrian cross-country skier. He has competed in FIS Cross-Country World Cup since 2011. His best result was at the Tour de Ski is third place in season 2013–14, but he was disqualified after he admitted to have been using Erythropoietin (EPO).

During the 2014 Winter Olympics Dürr finished eight in the skiathlon. He went home to Austria to train for the 50 km run but tested positive for EPO just days before the race. He was subsequently  disqualified from the skiathlon race.

Olympic results

World Championship results

World Cup results
All results are sourced from the International Ski Federation (FIS).

World Cup standings

References

External links

1987 births
Living people
Austrian male cross-country skiers
Austrian sportspeople in doping cases
Cross-country skiers at the 2014 Winter Olympics
Olympic cross-country skiers of Austria
Tour de Ski skiers
Doping cases in cross-country skiing
People from Melk
Sportspeople from Lower Austria
21st-century Austrian people